Portea is a genus in the plant family Bromeliaceae, subfamily Bromelioideae. It is native to the Atlantic coast of Brazil.

It is named for Dr. Marius Porte, a nineteenth-century French naturalist who died in 1866 in Manilla while on a collection expedition for the National Museum of Natural History.

Characteristics
Portea is a small group of plants. According to the Bromeliad Binomial, it currently includes just nine species. The plants are natives of the eastern coast of Brazil where they tend to be medium to large plants. They thrive in strong light. The foliage of this genus often is quite attractive, although heavily protected by sharp spines. The branches of the inflorescence are somewhat lengthy. This characteristic makes the bloom even more stunning.

The plant produces a tall bloom of lavender flowers followed by dark purple berries. Although the leaves are frost sensitive, the plants usually survive cold temperatures and produce blooms in the late spring.

Species

Cultivars
Portea 'Helga Tarver'
Portea 'June'

References

External links

Florida Council of Bromeliad Societies - Portea Photos
BSI Genera Gallery photos

 
Bromeliaceae genera
Taxa named by Adolphe-Théodore Brongniart
Taxa named by Karl Koch